Raja Dangdut is a film directed by Maman Firmansyah.

Synopsis 
Despite the already successful and have a lot of fans, Rhoma remains as usual, obedient to parents and pious. There was one girl fans are up to 100 times corresponded, Ida (Ida Royani). Rhoma sympathy and love. Ida thousands of poor widows seller hodgepodge. Rhoma's Mother (Netty Herawaty) Rhoma match with another girl, Mira (Naniek Nurcahyani) more modern and noble, while the father relented only Rhoma paralyzed. Rhoma reject the choice of his mother and his mother face challenges and Mira, among others booed Ida and went to shaman everything. Mira attitude that "modern" is not pleasing to Rhoma. After the accident and assisted Ida Mira, then Mira attitude changed. Then Ida and Rhoma officially married.

Cast 
 Rhoma Irama as Rhoma Irama
 Ida Royani as Ida
 Netty Herawaty as Rhoma's mother
 Naniek Nurcahyani as Mira
 Marlia Hardi as Mrs. Ida
 Aedy Moward as a Rhoma's father
 Urip Arphan as Shaman
 Alwi A. S. as a prince
 Yusfhani S. Martha
 Lina Budiarti
 Wiwiek Sulistiawati

Soundtrack 

This album has 5 new songs by Rhoma Irama with vocals performed by Ida Royani.

References 

Indonesian-language films
1978 films
Indonesian musical drama films